This article lists political parties in French Polynesia.

French Polynesia has a multi-party system, where multiple parties can achieve electoral success.

Current parties
 A here ia Porinetia ("I Love Polynesia") - Far-right, autonomist and anti-independence
 Amuitahira'a o te Nuna'a Maohi/Tāho'era'a Huira'atira ("Rally of the Maohi People") - Conservative, autonomist
 Hau Mā'ohi Tiama - pro-independence
 Ia Ora te Nuna'a - autonomist
 Tapura Huiraatira ("List of the People") - Autonomist
 Tavini Huiraatira ("People's Servant") - Pro-independence
 Heiura-Les Verts - Greens
 Here Ai'a (Love of the Land) - pro-independence
 Tau Hotu rau ("The New Era")

Former parties

 A Tia Porinetia [2013 - 2016]
Aia Api (New Land)
Fetia Api (New Star) [1996 - 2016] - Autonomist
No Oe E Te Nunaa (This Country Is Yours) 
Tapura Amui No Raromatai
Tapura Amui no Tuhaa Pae (Austral Archipelago Union List) [2001 - 2018] - Pro-independence
Tapura Amui No Te Faatereraa Manahune - Tuhaa Pae [2004] - Pro-independence Coalition

See also
 List of political parties by country

References

French Polynesia
 
Political parties
Political parties
+Polynesia
French Polynesia